Flinsberg is a suburb of Heilbad Heiligenstadt, district of Eichsfeld, Thuringia, Germany.

Flinsberg is the geographical centre of Germany.

Towns in Thuringia